The Subprefecture of Sé is one of 32 subprefectures of the city of São Paulo, Brazil.  It comprises eight districts: Bela Vista, Bom Retiro, Cambuci, Consolação, Liberdade, República, Sé, Santa Cecília. This subprefecture forms the inner city, historical core of the city. The São Paulo Stock Exchange is also located in this area.

See also
 Roman Catholic Archdiocese of São Paulo
 Vai-Vai

References

External links
 Subprefecture of Sé
 Roman Catholic Archdiocese of São Paulo

Subprefectures of São Paulo